Pittsburgh Riverhounds U-23 was an American soccer team based in Pittsburgh, Pennsylvania which began play with the 2014 PDL season. The team was affiliated with and served as a feeder team for the Pittsburgh Riverhounds of the USL. The team played in the Premier Development League (PDL), the fourth tier of the American Soccer Pyramid, in the Great Lakes Division.  The team plays their home games at Highmark Stadium. The final manager of the team was James McCaig.

History

Founding
On November 26, 2013, it was announced that the Pittsburgh Riverhounds had secured a Premier Development League franchise that would begin play during the 2014 PDL season.  At the time, no official name was unveiled but it was indicated that team would play under the Riverhounds umbrella. Riverhounds CEO Jason Kutney stated that the purpose of the team would be to provide standout local college players a place to play in the summer, something that they had not previously had. Kutney also believed that providing the opportunity to stay fit and play soccer in the region year-round would attract more players to the area in addition to providing players with the opportunity to be observed by USL and Major League Soccer scouts. At this time, it was also announced that the team would play their home matches at Highmark Stadium, likely as double-headers with their parent-club's matches

2014
The club's first head coach was Oz Bakirdan who was also head coach of the Illinois Central College Cougars at the time. The club's first match was scheduled for May 23, 2014 on the road against Chicago Fire Premier at Toyota Park. The Riverhounds went on to lose the match 1-2. The club played its inaugural home match at Highmark Stadium on June 4, 2013. The match ended in defeat also, with the Riverhounds losing 0-4 to the Michigan Bucks. The Riverhounds U23 finished the season in last place in the Great Lakes Division with 7  points from 14 matches. For their inaugural season, Geordhy Pantophlet was the team's top scorer with 7 points (3 goals, 1 assist) in 10 matches played. During the club's first season, at least 12 players from local colleges appeared on the 26-man roster.

2015
Prior to the 2015 PDL season, Josh Rife replaced Oz Bakirdan as head coach. Riverhounds U23 finished the season slightly improved over the previous with one more win and draw. However, the team again finished 6th in the Great Lakes Division and missed the playoffs. Lucas Silva and Jason Twum led the team in scoring with two goals each.

2016
In April 2016 it was announced that Rife was replaced as head coach by Englishman and former Arsenal F.C. youth coach James McCaig. Riverhounds U23 again competed in the Great Lakes Conference of the Central Division. The club opened its season on May 25, 2016, against the Michigan Bucks.

Disbanding
The club was disbanded following the 2016 season with limited resources being cited as the cause.

Seasons

Stadium
Highmark Stadium (2013–2016)

Managerial history

Notable former U23 players
Players who have signed for the Riverhound's first team:
 Ryan Hulings
 Anthony Virgara

Players who have signed for other professional clubs:
 Daniel Lynd — Rochester Rhinos
 Tyler Rudy — New England Revolution
 Devon Williams — New York Red Bulls II

References

External links
PDL Profile

Association football clubs established in 2013
USL League Two teams
Pittsburgh Riverhounds SC
Soccer clubs in Pittsburgh
2013 establishments in Pennsylvania
2016 disestablishments in Pennsylvania
Association football clubs disestablished in 2016